Raymond Howard may refer to: 

Raymond Howard (Wiccan) (fl. 1959–1967), English Wiccan
Raymond Howard (New Hampshire politician), member of the New Hampshire House of Representatives in 2014
Raymond Howard (politician), American politician active in Missouri
Raymond Howard, American who disappeared with his wife, see "The Way" (Fastball song)